Alcalde (Spanish for mayor) is a census-designated place (CDP) in Rio Arriba County, New Mexico, United States. The population was 285 at the 2010 census.

Geography

Climate

Demographics

At the 2000 census there were 377 people, 121 households, and 99 families in the CDP. The population density was 735.3 people per square mile (285.4/km). There were 138 housing units at an average density of 269.2 per square mile (104.5/km). The racial makeup of the CDP was 37.40% White, 0.27% African American, 1.59% Native American, 0.27% Asian, 54.64% from other races, and 5.84% from two or more races. Hispanic or Latino of any race were 89.12%.

Of the 121 households 46.3% had children under the age of 18 living with them, 52.1% were married couples living together, 19.8% had a female householder with no husband present, and 17.4% were non-families. 16.5% of households were one person and 7.4% were one person aged 65 or older. The average household size was 3.12 and the average family size was 3.39.

The age distribution was 32.9% under the age of 18, 7.2% from 18 to 24, 32.1% from 25 to 44, 15.4% from 45 to 64, and 12.5% 65 or older. The median age was 31 years. For every 100 females, there were 95.3 males. For every 100 females age 18 and over, there were 99.2 males.

The median household income was $37,969 and the median family income was $38,250. Males had a median income of $31,375 versus $20,341 for females. The per capita income for the CDP was $13,656. About 10.7% of families and 12.6% of the population were below the poverty line, including 8.6% of those under age 18 and 13.6% of those age 65 or over.

Education
It is in Española Public Schools. Alcalde has one elementary school, Alcalde Elementary. The comprehensive public high school is Española Valley High School.

Oñate Monument Center
The Oñate Monument Center located in Alcalde on New Mexico Highway 68.

See also

 List of census-designated places in New Mexico

References

External links

 Abiquiu Online – Serving the Northern New Mexico Area
 Los Matachines – Alcalde, photo gallery

Census-designated places in Rio Arriba County, New Mexico
Census-designated places in New Mexico